Bad Dürrheim (Low Alemannic: Diirä) is a town in the district of Schwarzwald-Baar, in Baden-Württemberg, Germany. It is situated east of the Black Forest, 8 km north of Donaueschingen, and 6 km southeast of Villingen.

From 1951 until 1978, Bad Dürrheim was a location of a broadcasting transmitter for mediumwave.

Mayors

 1946–1954: Wilhelm Grießhaber
 1954–1979: Otto Weissenberger
 1979–2003: Gerhard Hagmann
 2003-2019: Walter Klumpp
 2019- : Jonathan Berggötz

Twin towns — sister cities
Bad Dürrheim is twinned with:

  Hajdúszoboszló, Hungary
  Enghien-les-Bains, France
  Spotorno, Italy

Honorary citizens
 1937: Walter Köhler (1897-1989), politician (NSDAP), (Minister-President of Baden), honorary citizenship canceled on 28 May 1946 by order of the District Administrator Bienzeisler of Villingen

References

External links

  Official website

Schwarzwald-Baar-Kreis
Spa towns in Germany